Thliboclivina is a genus of beetles in the family Carabidae, containing the following species:

 Thliboclivina amalita Basilewsky, 1964
 Thliboclivina diophthalmica (Basilewsky, 1955)
 Thliboclivina microphthalma (Burgeon, 1937)

References

Scaritinae